Mordellistena coelioxys is a beetle in the genus Mordellistena of the family Mordellidae. It was described in 1917 by Lea.

References

coelioxys
Beetles described in 1917